The Ministry of Human Settlements and Development (MHSD), is the regional executive department of the Bangsamoro Autonomous Region in Muslim Mindanao (BARMM) responsible for management of housing and human settlement in the region as well as affairs relating to both rural and urban development.

The MHSD did not have a counterpart office from the Autonomous Region in Muslim Mindanao (ARMM), the predecessor autonomous region of Bangsamoro. Some of Bangsamoro's ministries were reorganized from the regional offices of national government bodies in the ARMM.

Ministers

References

Human Settlements
Bangsamoro
Bangsamoro